Kamel Ali El-Sayed (born 13 May 1935) is an Egyptian wrestler. He competed at the 1960 Summer Olympics and the 1964 Summer Olympics.

References

1935 births
Living people
Egyptian male sport wrestlers
Olympic wrestlers of Egypt
Wrestlers at the 1960 Summer Olympics
Wrestlers at the 1964 Summer Olympics
Sportspeople from Cairo
20th-century Egyptian people